Tupa, Tupá, or Tupã can refer to:

 Tupã (mythology) (Guaraní mythology)
 Tupã, São Paulo, city in São Paulo state, Brazil
 Tupã Futebol Clube, Tupã, São Paulo, Brazil
 Tupã, proper name of star HD 108147 in the constellation of Crux
 Tupá, a village and municipality in Levice District, Slovakia
 Tom Tupa, NFL football player
 Ron Tupa, member of the Colorado Senate
 Lobelia tupa, a species of flower
 TUPA, ICAO designation for Auguste George Airport, British Virgin Islands
 Tupa, a fictional city in The Empire of Great Kesh, in the Riftwar fictional universe